Volodymyr Hlyvka (born 24 August 1973) is a Ukrainian ski jumper. He competed at the 1998 Winter Olympics and the 2002 Winter Olympics.

References

1973 births
Living people
Ukrainian male ski jumpers
Olympic ski jumpers of Ukraine
Ski jumpers at the 1998 Winter Olympics
Ski jumpers at the 2002 Winter Olympics
Sportspeople from Lviv